The Best of Uriah Heep (also known as Best of...) is the title of the most successful compilation album by the British rock band Uriah Heep. It was released by Bronze Records and Mercury Records in three distinct editions with roughly the same songs, but different cover art and track listing. The first edition was released in 1974 in Canada, the second in 1975 in Europe and the third the following year in the US. Some European editions had the song "Lady in Black" substituted by "Suicidal Man". The compilation reached gold status in Germany.

Track listings

Canadian edition
Side one
"The Magician's Birthday" (Mick Box, Ken Hensley, Lee Kerslake) – 10:23
"Look at Yourself" (Hensley) – 5:07
"The Wizard" (Mark Clarke, Hensley) – 2:59

Side two
"Gypsy" (David Byron, Box) – 2:45
"Walking in Your Shadow" (Byron, Paul Newton) – 4:31
"Easy Livin'" (Hensley) – 2:37
"Love Machine" (Box, Byron, Hensley) – 3:37

European edition
Side one
"Gypsy" – 2:45
"Bird of Prey" (Box, Byron, Ken Hensley, Paul Newton) – 4:05
"July Morning" (Byron, Hensley) – 10:36
"Look at Yourself" – 5:07

Side two
"Easy Livin'" – 2:36
"The Wizard" – 2:59
"Sweet Lorraine" (Box, Byron, Gary Thain) – 4:13
"Stealin'" (Hensley) – 3:17
"Lady in Black" (Hensley) – 4:43
"Return to Fantasy" (Hensley, Byron) – 5:52

US edition
Side one
"Easy Livin'" – 2:37
"Lady in Black" – 4:43
"Bird of Prey" – 4:05
"Sunrise" (Hensley) – 4:04
"The Wizard" – 2:59
"Sweet Lorraine" – 4:13

Side two
"July Morning" – 10:36
"Look at Yourself" – 5:07
"Gypsy" – 6:37

Charts

Certifications

References

1976 greatest hits albums
Uriah Heep (band) compilation albums
Albums produced by Gerry Bron
Mercury Records compilation albums
Bronze Records compilation albums